
The following lists events that happened during 1842 in South Africa.

Events
 War breaks out between the British and the Boers in Natal. See Battle of Congella
 Dick King rides his horse ride from Durban to Grahamstown to get help
 Waterloo is wrecked in Table Bay with great loss of life.

References
See Years in South Africa for list of References

 
Years in South Africa